Ing Yoe Tan (18 April 1948 – 10 April 2020) was a Dutch lawmaker. She was a member of the Senate for the Labour Party (PvdA) between 8 June 1999 and 7 June 2011.

Tan was born in The Hague. She came from a Chinese Indonesian family during the Dutch East Indies era; Dutch was the language most spoken by the family.

She died in Amsterdam, aged 71, due to COVID-19.

See also
 European politicians of Chinese descent

Sources

1948 births
2020 deaths
Dutch politicians of Chinese descent
Labour Party (Netherlands) politicians
Members of the Senate (Netherlands)
Politicians from The Hague
Deaths from the COVID-19 pandemic in the Netherlands